This is a simplified table of Japanese kanji visual components (graphemes) that does away with all the archaic forms found in the Japanese version of the Kangxi radicals.

The 214 Kanji radicals are technically classifiers as they are not always etymologically correct, but since linguistics uses that word in the sense of "classifying" nouns (such as in counter words), dictionaries commonly call the kanji components radicals. As dictionaries have moved from textbooks to interactive screens, the term "radicals" seems to now be used for any kanji component used in a visual search.

Most common radicals
There are two readings for a kanji: On'yomi and Kun'yomi. On'yomi is a reading derived from the Chinese way of reading, Kun'yomi is the original Japanese reading.

Table of kanji radicals

Table key
Position category:
 へん (hen) - left ◧ - radical forms the left component of a kanji.
 つくり (tsukuri) - right ◨ - radical forms the right component of a kanji.
 かんむり (kanmuri) - top ⊤ - radical forms the top component of a kanji.
 あし (ashi) - bottom ⊥ - radical forms the bottom component of a kanji.
 かまえ (kamae) - wrap ⿴ - radical encloses the other kanji components.
 たれ (tare) - top-left ⿸ - radical forms the left and top components of a kanji.
 にょう (nyou) - bottom-left ⿺ - radical forms the left and bottom component of a kanji.
 Either left or right ◫ - radical can form either the left or right component of a kanji.

Notes
 This is a simplified list, so the reading of the radical is only given if the kanji is used on its own.
 Example kanji for each radical are all jōyō kanji, but some examples show all jōyō (ordered by stroke number) while others were from the Chinese radicals page with non-jōyō (and Chinese-only) characters removed.
 No radicals with more than 12 strokes are listed as they are not as common and can all be formed from the other components.
 The radicals are listed in the same basic order that the Kanji radicals are listed except for the two and three-stroke radicals which are in a more visual order.

Table

Other combinations

Variations of this table
Many other combinations could realistically be called a simplified table of kanji radicals, here are a few examples.
 䒑 could replace both 丷 and 艹
 ⺈ could be merged with 刀 or 勹 (not commonly used as a radical by itself)
 聿 or 書 could be used instead of ⺻

Entries with an upside-down exclamation mark (¡) are possibly made up "radicals," meaning only one online dictionary was found to use them (Tangorin Online).

Possible additions: (Note that the examples below show all the jōyō kanji examples)

List of radicals that form common jōyō kanji and are a part of the Table of Japanese kanji radicals page but do not appear here. All jōyō kanji examples for each radical are listed.

Radicals ordered by frequency
With frequency considered to be the amount of kanji where the radical or its variants can be found as a visual component.
 Variants of the same radical are separated by forward slashes (for example 彐/ヨ/⺕)
 The first radical on the list (口) is the most frequent and can be seen in 2839 kanji
 The last radical on the list (斉) is the least frequent and can be seen in 5 kanji

The 79 Radicals
A simplification used in "The Kanji Dictionary", "The Learner's Kanji Dictionary," "Japanese, Chinese, and Korean Surnames and How to Read Them", and in "Kanji & Kana."

See also 
 List of kanji radicals by stroke count
 List of Unicode radicals
 Kangxi radical

References

External links

 https://web.archive.org/web/20130902010033/http://jisho.org/kanji/radicals
 http://tangorin.com/general/ (multi-radical search)
 http://www.kanjinetworks.com/eng/kanji-dictionary/chinese-kanji-frequency-chart.cfm
 http://kanjialive.com/214-traditional-kanji-radicals/

Kanji